Dizaj-e Parvaneh (also Romanized as Dīzaj-e Parvāneh) is a village in Benajuy-ye Sharqi Rural District, in the Central District of Bonab County, East Azerbaijan Province, Iran. At the 2006 census, its population was 1,028, in 248 families.

References 

Populated places in Bonab County